Ben Aggrey Ntim is a Ghanaian engineer and politician. He was Minister for Communication under President John Kufour.

Educational life
Ntim received his Bachelor of Science in engineering with 1st Class Honors in 1966. He then proceeded to the London University for a Doctor of Philosophy in aeronautical engineering.

Engineering career
Ntim worked as an engineer at Rolls-Royce subsequent to achieving his Ph.D. At Rolls-Royce he worked on the research and design of compressor blades. Upon leaving Rolls-Royce Ntim joined UNESCO as a specialist in engineering. Ntim is the current Director Chairmen of Omatek Computers Ltd.

References

Living people
Year of birth missing (living people)
Government ministers of Ghana
Ghanaian engineers